The 2017 200 km of Buenos Aires was the eighth edition of this race in the TC2000 season. The race was held in the Autódromo Juan y Óscar Gálvez in Buenos Aires.

Report

Race Results

References 
http://www.supertc2000.com.ar/carreras.php?accion=tiempos&id=270

Buenos Aires 200km
Buenos Aires